"Yeh Yeh Yeh" is a song by British singer-songwriter Melanie C. It was the third and final single from Chisolm's second solo album, Reason (2003). The song was released as a double A-side with "Melt" in the United Kingdom. In the rest of Europe, "Yeh Yeh Yeh" was released alone as the final single. The song was also sampled for a remix of the song "Tanha Dil" by Indian singer, Shaan.

Background and release
Alongside "Melt", "Yeh Yeh Yeh" was a last-minute addition for the track listing for Reason.
Originally, the plan was to release "Yeh Yeh Yeh" as the third single on 22 September 2003, but shortly before this could happen, Chisolm injured her knee in TV show The Games during a judo match with Azra Akın. Because Chisolm was limited in movement, she could not fully promote an upbeat song with an injury, causing the original release date to get pushed back. Nevertheless she performed the song with her injured knee in a limited manner. "Melt", being an easier song to promote with an injury, was added to the mix, resulting in the double single.

The single was released on 10 November 2003, but there were numerous problems. On most CD1s of the set, the track listing was accidentally swapped so that "Yeh Yeh Yeh" was the first track on the CD. Because of this misprint, and following strong competition, lack of proper promotion, and distribution problems, the single entered the UK Singles Chart at number twenty-seven, sealing Chisholm's fate with Virgin Records and further hindering any hope for the album's success. The single sold just 8,313 copies in the UK but peaked at number 13 in Spain.

Music video
The accompanying music video was directed by Ray Kay, and filmed in a giant studio on 26–27 June 2003 in Oslo, Norway. The video appears to draw influences from the video of Chisholm's previous single "Goin' Down" as it takes place in a giant warehouse styled as a club. The video opens with Melanie waking up in a large crowd filled with people passed out on the floor. As she arises and starts performing with her band, everyone wakes up and begins dancing and jumping intensely. There are also scenes of skaters performing the half-pipe structure and various people dancing in a big cage. Behind the scenes footage was also shown on Top of the Pops Saturday where Melanie was shown re-creating the music video with a much lower budget.

Formats and track listings
These are the formats and track listings of major single releases of "Yeh Yeh Yeh".

UK CD
 "Melt"  – 3:44
 "Yeh Yeh Yeh"  – 3:43

UK CD2
 "Melt"  – 3:44
 "Yeh Yeh Yeh"  – 3:43
 "Knocked Out" – 3:50
 "Yeh Yeh Yeh"  – 3:40

European CD
 "Yeh Yeh Yeh"  – 3:43
 "Knocked Out" – 3:50
 "Yeh Yeh Yeh"  – 7:34

European DVD
 "Yeh Yeh Yeh"  – 3:43
 "Knocked Out" – 3:50
 "I Wish"  – 4:24
 Behind the Scenes – 2:00

Official versions
 "Yeh Yeh Yeh" (album version) – 4:19
 "Yeh Yeh Yeh" (radio mix) – 3:43
 "Yeh Yeh Yeh" (Shanghai Surprise Remix) – 7:34
 "Yeh Yeh Yeh" (Shanghai Surprise Remix Edit) – 3:51
 "Yeh Yeh Yeh" (Shanghai Surprise Dub) – 6:35

Live performances
Melanie C performed the song on the following concert tours and TV shows:
 Reason Tour
 Top of the Pops Saturday
 The Barfly Mini-Tour
 Beautiful Intentions Tour
 Live Hits
 This Time Canadian Tour
 The Sea – Live

Charts

References

2003 singles
Melanie C songs
Songs written by Rhett Lawrence
Songs written by Melanie C
2003 songs
Virgin Records singles
Song recordings produced by Rhett Lawrence

bg:Yeh Yeh Yeh
it:Melt / Yeh Yeh Yeh
ja:Melt / Yeh Yeh Yeh
pt:Yeh Yeh Yeh